The 55th Illinois Volunteer Infantry Regiment was an infantry regiment that served in the Union Army during the American Civil War. The regiment is sometimes referred to as the Canton Rifles or the Douglas Brigade 2nd Regiment.

Service

The 55th Illinois Infantry was organized at Camp Douglas, Chicago, Illinois and mustered into Federal service on October 31, 1861. Training continued at Benton Barracks, Missouri. The 55th was part of Sherman's Yazoo Expedition.

The regiment was mustered out on August 14, 1865.

Total strength and casualties
The regiment suffered casualties including nine officers, 149 enlisted men who were killed in action, or mortally wounded, and two officers and 127 enlisted men who died of disease, for a total of 286 fatalities.

Commanders
Colonel David Stuart - promoted to brigadier general on November 29, 1862, U.S. Senate refused to confirm appointment, resigned April 3, 1863
Colonel Oscar Malmborg

Notable members
 Coproral Robert M. Cox, Company K — Defended the colors planted on the outward parapet of Fort Hill.
 Private Jerome Morford, Company K — Participating in a diversionary "forlorn hope" attack on Confederate defenses, 22 May 1863.
 Private Jacob Sanford, Company K — Participating in the same "forlorn hope."
 First Lieutenant John Warden, Company E — Participating in the same "forlorn hope."
 Chaplain (Lieutenant Colonel) Milton L. Haney, Regimental Chaplain — The "Fighting Chaplain" received the Medal of Honor for his actions in the Battle of Atlanta, 22 July 1864.  Haney was one of only nine chaplains awarded the CMH in American history.

See also

Memphis and Charleston Railroad
Milton L. Haney
List of Illinois Civil War Units
Illinois in the American Civil War

Notes

References

The Civil War Archive

External links
The Story of the Fifty-fifth Regiment Illinois Volunteer Infantry in the Civil War
Benton Barracks, The Missouri Civil War Museum
55th Illinois Infantry at Vicksburg
 A Forlorn Hope
 Vicksburg Medal of Honor Recipients

Units and formations of the Union Army from Illinois
1861 establishments in Illinois
Military units and formations established in 1861
Military units and formations disestablished in 1865